Mie Højlund (born 24 October 1997) is a Danish handball player for Odense Håndbold and the Danish national team.

Achievements
Danish League: 
Winner: 2021, 2022
Danish Cup
Winner: 2020

Individual awards 
 Youth player of the Year in Damehåndboldligaen: 2015/16, 2016/17

References

External links

1997 births
Living people
Danish female handball players
People from Favrskov Municipality
Sportspeople from the Central Denmark Region
21st-century Danish women